Zodarion graecum is a spider species found in Eastern Europe, Lebanon and Israel.

See also 
 List of Zodariidae species

References

External links 

graecum
Spiders of Europe
Spiders of Asia
Fauna of Lebanon
Spiders described in 1984